Pillans & Rose v Van Mierop & Hopkins (1765) 3 Burr 1663 is a case concerning letters of credit, and the doctrine of consideration. It has been recommended as a landmark case in English contract law. Lord Mansfield tentatively expressed a view that the doctrine of consideration was redundant. However, in Rann v Hughes the House of Lords doubted the presumption.

Facts
Pillans & Rose were in business together as merchant bankers in Rotterdam. They agreed to accept bills from White, an Irish merchant, on one condition. White had to make sure Van Mierop & Hopkins, a big London firm, would guarantee the bills. Van Mierop confirmed that they would do so and would guarantee a pre-existing duty of White to pay Pillans. However, before the bills were drawn on Van Mierop, White went insolvent. Van Mierop refused to honour the bills and argued that Pillans had not provided consideration for their guarantee since there was the rule that past consideration is not a good consideration.

Judgment
Lord Mansfield held that the doctrine of consideration should not be applied to preclude enforcement of promises made in mercantile transactions.

Wilmot J said,

See also
Swift v. Tyson

Notes

References
G McMeel, ch 2 in C Mitchell and P Mitchell, Landmark Cases in the Law of Contract (2008)
Grotius, War & Peace, Book II, Ch 9, para 6, 703-4 and 719-20
Pufendorf, The Whole Duty of Man According to the Law of Nature, Ch IX, para V-IX, 110-1

Lord Mansfield cases
English enforceability case law
English consideration case law
1765 in case law
1765 in British law
Court of King's Bench (England) cases
United Kingdom constitutional case law